St Nicholas Hospital is an NHS psychiatric hospital located in Gosforth, Newcastle upon Tyne, England, UK. The entrance is located on Jubilee Road. The buildings range from Victorian-era to modern facilities and occupies  of land. It is managed by Cumbria, Northumberland, Tyne and Wear NHS Foundation Trust.

History

Early history
As Newcastle upon Tyne did not have a hospital for mentally ill patients of its own, a new asylum was proposed in Coxlodge, where a  farmstead known as Dodd's Farm was purchased. In 1864 initial plans were drawn up, and William Lambie Moffatt was appointed architect. The facility opened as Newcastle upon Tyne Borough Lunatic Asylum in July 1869 and became the Newcastle upon Tyne City Lunatic Asylum in 1882. Some of the first patients were transferred from Bensham Asylum as Durham County Magistrates had refused to renew the contract of that facility.

In 1884 permission was granted to extend the hospital, and the East and West Pavilions were completed in 1887. These allowed an additional 80 patients to be admitted. The asylum steadily grew, with more buildings were erected. During the First World War the patients were evacuated and the hospital became Northumberland No. 1 War Hospital for wounded soldiers, who were brought there by train. The facility reverted to serving as an asylum again in 1921. In 1948 the National Health Service took over the hospital and changed the name to St Nicholas Hospital.

A new admissions unit called the Collingwood Clinic was opened in 1956. The site of the former Collingwood Clinic is now used by Gosforth Community Fire Station and Virgin Money.

In 1986 a church that had been located within the hospital grounds burned down. The area used by the church is now occupied by the 1994-built Ashgrove Nursing Home.

Recent history 
Work to build an extension, the Bamburgh Clinic, on the site of a former fish factory, at a cost of £22 million started in November 2004 and was completed in April 2006. The new clinic is bordered by residential properties and a Northumberland Wildlife Trust wildlife centre and office.

In 2009 the Greentrees unit and the Lennox Ward were renovated at a cost of circa £8 million. The renovation of these Victorian hospital buildings was one of eight projects short-listed from 20 entries for the Best Design in the Community Benefit category of the Royal Institution of Chartered Surveyors North-East Renaissance Awards.

Jubilee Theatre 

The hospital also includes the Jubilee Theatre, a theatre which opened in 1899. Currently the theatre is primarily used by two groups: Juniper Productions (founded 1998) a drama group for sufferers of mental health difficulties, and since 1992, an external theatre company, First Act Theatre.

Bibliography

See also
 List of hospitals in England

References

External links 
 Northumberland, Tyne and Wear NHS Foundation Trust

Hospital buildings completed in 1869
NHS hospitals in England
Teaching hospitals in England
Hospitals established in 1864
Hospitals in Tyne and Wear
Psychiatric hospitals in England
1864 establishments in England